The erg is a unit of energy equal to 10−7joules (100nJ). It originated in the Centimetre–gram–second system of units (CGS). It has the symbol erg. The erg is not an SI unit.

An erg is the amount of work done by a force of one dyne exerted for a distance of one centimetre. In the CGS base units, it is equal to one gram centimetre-squared per second-squared (g⋅cm2/s2). It is thus equal to 10−7 joules or 100 nanojoules (nJ) in SI units.

 1 erg =  = 
 1 erg =  =  = 
 1 erg =  = 
 1 erg =  = 
 1 erg =

History
In 1864, Rudolf Clausius proposed the Greek word  for the unit of energy, work and heat. In 1873, a committee of the British Association for the Advancement of Science, including British physicists James Clerk Maxwell and William Thomson recommended the general adoption of the centimetre, the gramme, and the second as fundamental units (C.G.S. System of Units). To distinguish derived units, they recommended using the prefix "C.G.S. unit of ..." and requested that the word erg or ergon be strictly limited to refer to the C.G.S. unit of energy.

In 1922, chemist William Draper Harkins proposed the name micri-erg as a convenient unit to measure the surface energy of molecules in surface chemistry. It would equate to 10−14 erg, the equivalent to 10−21 joule.

The erg has not been a valid unit since 1 January 1978 when the European Economic Community ratified a directive of 1971 that implemented the International System (SI) as agreed by the General Conference of Weights and Measures. It is still widely used in astrophysics and sometimes in mechanics.

See also
 Foe (unit), relative measure for energy released by a supernova
 Lumen second, for the lumerg and lumberg units
 Metre–tonne–second system of units

References

Units of energy
Centimetre–gram–second system of units